Socki Creek is a stream in the U.S. state of Mississippi.

Socki may be a word derived from the Choctaw language signifying "bank; bluff". A variant name is "Sock Creek".

References

Rivers of Mississippi
Rivers of Attala County, Mississippi
Rivers of Leake County, Mississippi
Mississippi placenames of Native American origin